The WIPI protein family (WD-repeat protein Interacting with PhosphoInositides) is an evolutionarily conserved family of proteins. WIPI proteins contain a WD repeat domain that folds into a 7-bladed beta-propeller that functions in autophagy, and contain a conserved motif for interaction with phospholipids.

Members of this family include:

References 

Protein families